The Canadian Fascist Party was a fascist political party based in the city of Winnipeg, Manitoba, Canada in the 1930s. The formative core of the party was a splinter group from the Canadian Nationalist Party that found the principles of corporatism to be more important than the largely racial motivations of the Nationalist Party. This disposition is highlighted in one official statement that "anti-semitism was a symptom of Germany not of Fascism". The party was founded as the British Empire Union of Fascists and was affiliated with the British Union of Fascists. It later became known as the Canadian Union of Fascists and Canadian Union.  It published its own newspaper, The Thunderbolt.

The party was led by "Chuck" Crate, who became leader at the age of 17. He had contacted the British Union of Fascists, who put him in touch with the party. John Ross Taylor of Toronto became the party's secretary and organizer.

The party had a hard time attracting supporters because most Canadians who supported fascism leaned towards the racist brand espoused by Adrien Arcand and others. At the party's first meeting, there was an attendance of roughly 200 people.

This disparity between the party and Arcand's would continue throughout its existence. Before the government took action against Canadian fascist parties, the Canadian Union of Fascists and Arcand's group held simultaneous fascist congresses in Toronto. While Arcand's group, dubbed the "National Union" drew a crowd of around 4,000, the Canadian Union managed to draw only some 30 local residents to its cause.

The party was dissolved when the Second World War began. The party told its members to obey the law but to work for a negotiated peace. Crate escaped a treason charge and ended up in the Royal Canadian Navy.

The party, though not officially racist or anti-semitic, had strong connections to Adrien Arcand's National Unity Party.

References

See also

 Fascism in Canada
 List of political parties in Canada

Canadian far-right political movements
Federal political parties in Canada
1930s establishments in Manitoba
Political parties established in the 1930s